Janusz Andrzej Kotański (born 29 April 1957 in Warsaw) is a Polish historian and teacher, since 2016 serving as an ambassador to the Holy See.

Life 
Janusz Kotański was born in 1957 in Warsaw. In 1983, he has earned his master's degree from the University of Warsaw, Faculty of History. He has been studying also law.

He was working as a high school teacher and as a specialist at the Ministry of Culture and National Heritage, as well as at the Polish Information Agency and as a historian at the Institute of National Remembrance and at the Museum of John Paul II and Primate Wyszyński.

In 2016 he was nominated ambassador to the Holy See, accredited also to the Sovereign Military Order of Malta. He presented his credentials to Pope Francis on 23 June 2016. He ended his term on 15 May 2022.

He is married.

Works 

 Polacy w ZSRR 1917–1947 (co-author), Warszawa 1990
 Wiersze, Warszawa 1991
 Krym i inne wiersze, Kraków 1993
 44 wiersze, Warszawa 1999
 Ksiądz Jerzy Popiełuszko, Warszawa 2004, 2010
 Kropla, Warszawa 2006
 Czas przemian 1979–1989. Znaczenie pierwszych trzech pielgrzymek Jana Pawła II do Ojczyzny, Warszawa 2010
 Nic niemożliwego, Warszawa 2011
 Prymas Stefan Wyszyński w służbie Bogu, człowiekowi i narodowi, Warszawa 2011
 Głos, Warszawa: Fronda PL 2014

References 

 

1957 births
Ambassadors of Poland to the Holy See
University of Warsaw alumni
Living people
Writers from Warsaw
20th-century Polish historians
Polish male non-fiction writers
Diplomats from Warsaw
21st-century Polish historians